The 1965–66 West Midlands (Regional) League season was the 66th in the history of the West Midlands (Regional) League, an English association football competition for semi-professional and amateur teams based in the West Midlands county, Shropshire, Herefordshire, Worcestershire and southern Staffordshire.

At the end of the previous season the second division was introduced. It was made up largely of reserve sides of non-league clubs, the majority of which were in the league’s new ‘Premier Division’.

Premier Division

The Premier Division featured 17 clubs which competed in the league last season, along with three new clubs:
Cinderford Town, joined from the Warwickshire Combination
Port Vale reserves
Wolverhampton Wanderers "A"

Also, Banbury Spencer changed name to Banbury United.

League table

References

External links

1965–66
W